The Khoirentak tiger was a vicious monster in Meitei mythology that lived in Khoirentak. It was eventually killed by Khuman Khamba.
The tiger caused havoc to the people of the Khoirentak in Ancient Moirang, thereby becoming the "man eater" of the region. Finally, Khuman Khamba and Nongban were ordered by the king, to catch the beast. In the first encounter, Nongban was killed by the tiger and at the final meet, Khuman Khamba successfully captured and killed it. Finally, when he brought it to the capital city of Ancient Moirang, Thoibi was given to him, hand in marriage.

Further reading

References 

Meitei mythology
Meitei literature
Meitei folklore
Pages with unreviewed translations